Xinshi Subdistrict is a subdistrict of Baiyun District, Guangzhou, located immediately to the west of the former Baiyun Airport. , it has 19 residential communities under its administration.

See also
List of township-level divisions of Guangdong

References 

Township-level divisions of Guangdong
Baiyun District, Guangzhou
Subdistricts of the People's Republic of China